Michael Heath (born 9 January 1953) is an English former semi-professional footballer who played in the Football League as a forward for Brentford.

Career statistics

References

1953 births
Living people
Footballers from Hillingdon
English footballers
Association football forwards
Walton & Hersham F.C. players
Brentford F.C. players
Southall F.C. players
Wimbledon F.C. players
English Football League players